The Bintulu District is one of two districts of Bintulu Division in Sarawak, Malaysia. It has a total area of 7,220.40 square kilometres. Bintulu District has a sub-district, which is Sebauh. There are two towns in Bintulu District, namely Bintulu, which is the capital of both Bintulu District and Bintulu Division, and Sebauh.

Demography 
The population of Bintulu District (year 2008 estimate) was 186,100. Most of the Bintulu district's population is concentrated at Bintulu proper.

Ethnics 
Bintulu is traditionally a home to Iban, Chinese, Melanau, Malay, Orang Ulu and Kedayan people. Most Ibans are scattered throughout rural areas of Bintulu, namely in Tatau and Sebauh. Whilst, Melanau people (or Melanau Bintulu/Vaie people) are concentrated at the town areas in Bintulu and rural communal areas, namely at Bintulu town, Sebauh, Pandan and Labang. Many Malay people are not originally from Bintulu, however, intermarriage with locals especially Melanau people has made Malay as one of the major ethnics in Bintulu. Chinese people are more concentrated at town areas, such as at Bintulu, Sebauh and Tanjung Kidurong, while some resides at Kuala Kebulu and Jelalong. Orang Ulu people, such as Kenyah, Kayan, Tatau, Penan and Punan are more scattered throughout Bintulu district compared to Iban people. Most of them still live deep in the rural areas like Kakus and Jelalong. Kedayan people, although small in number, can be spotted at Nyalau areas (100 km from Bintulu) just at the border with Miri Division.

There is a large influx of foreign worker population due to the strength of the petroleum industry. It was estimated more than 20% of Bintulu population are foreign workers and expatriates.

Economy 

The economy is largely based on the petroleum and natural gas industries. In addition to export as liquified natural gas, on-shore facilities produce fertiliser, and formaldehyde resins.

Bintulu has around 27% of Sarawak's tropical rainforest, and the timber industry remains a strong component of the Division's economy. Agriculture is relatively minor although growing steadily, with oil palm, rattan and pepper the main products. Deposits of coal have been discovered, but are yet unexploited.

Climate

Transportation 

Although Bintulu is well connected to other parts of Sarawak with good networks of road, river transports still play the vital role in Bintulu. People of Bintulu District can opt for rural shuttle bus service to Tatau, Sebauh, Nyalau, even as far as Sungai Asap in Kapit Division. The only shuttle bus operating for both town and rural services is Jepak Holding.

As for people who wish to travel to upriver areas which are inaccessible by road such as Jelalong, Ng. Tau, Pandan, Labang, Kuala Serupai, Kuala Baggiau, Sungai Anap and Bukit Balai, they have to use available ferry and boat services. River transport charges remain high in Bintulu Division due to the long distance of the upriver areas.

There are some rural areas which are accessible by timber tracks and palm estate roads such as Labang, Tubau and Kakus. Availability of transports to these areas are limited through bookings at Bintulu town, using private vans or four-wheel drive vehicles.

Infrastructure 

Pan-Borneo Highway is a trunk road linking Bintulu to the rest of Sarawak. Bintulu District is expected to expand rapidly due to Similajau being part of Sarawak Corridor of Renewal Energy regional development and ongoing gas pipeline project from Sabah to Tanjung Kidurong.

Education 

Bintulu District has a moderate number of public schools. Most secondary schools in Bintulu Division are located at Bintulu district. As for primary schools, most of them are scattered throughout Bintulu. Some of them are located deep in the Bintulu district's interior to cater for rural students. There is one secondary school run privately which is SM Kai Dee, a Chinese education-based school.

Bintulu District is home to a public university branch which is Universiti Putra Malaysia (UPM) and various government education institutions such as GIATMARA, IKM and ADTEC. There is also a private education institution which is Kolej Sedamai.

Healthcare 

Bintulu District has one government hospital which is Bintulu Hospital and one government policlinic at Bintulu town. There are also private-owned hospital such as Columbia-Asia Hospital at Tanjung Kidurong and Bintulu Medical Centre at Bintulu town. As for Tatau and Sebauh sub-district, both has their own health clinic. Smaller government health clinics do exist at Labang and Tubau.

Security 

Bintulu District has a police district office. There are also police stations and police bits located at strategic locations, as well as rural areas. Like other district in the division, Bintulu so far has no district military bases. Only small military camps do exist just to make presence.

Government services 

Many government offices have set up their branches in Bintulu district (some at Sebauh sub-district and other smaller communal areas) such as Royal Customs, Fire and Rescue Department, Education Department, etc.

See also
 Sarawak
 Bintulu Division
 Tatau District
 Sebauh Sub-district

References

External links
 Bintulu Tourism
 Bintulu National Parks